Annai Hajira Women's College, is a women's general degree college located in Melapalayam, Tirunelveli district, Tamil Nadu. It was established in the year 2004. The college is affiliated with Manonmaniam Sundaranar University. This college offers different courses in arts, commerce and science.

Departments

Science
Physics
Mathematics
Computer Science
Chemistry

Arts and Commerce
English
Commerce

Accreditation
The college is  recognized by the University Grants Commission (UGC).

See also
Education in India
Literacy in India
List of educational institutions in Tirunelveli district
List of institutions of higher education in Tamil Nadu

References

External links
http://annaihajiracollege.com

Educational institutions established in 2004
2004 establishments in Tamil Nadu
Colleges affiliated to Manonmaniam Sundaranar University
Universities and colleges in Tirunelveli district